Mesic may refer to:
 Mesic, North Carolina, a town in the United States
 Mesic habitat, a type of habitat

See also
Mesić (disambiguation)
Mešić
Meson

hr:Mesić
pt:Mesic